Fairfield may refer to:

Places

Australia
 Fairfield, New South Wales, a western suburb of Sydney. 
Electoral district of Fairfield, the corresponding seat in the New South Wales Legislative Assembly
 Fairfield, Queensland
 Fairfield, Victoria
 Fairfield West, New South Wales
 Fairfield Heights, New South Wales
 Fairfield East, New South Wales

Canada
 Fairfield (Greater Victoria), a neighbourhood of Victoria, British Columbia

New Zealand
 Fairfield, Otago, a suburb of Dunedin
 Fairfield, Waikato, a suburb of Hamilton
 Fairfield, Wellington, a suburb of Lower Hutt

United Kingdom
 Fairfield (Croydon ward)
 Fairfield (Wandsworth ward)
 Fairfield, Bedfordshire, a village
 Fairfield, Bromsgrove, a village in north-east Worcestershire
 Fairfield, Bury, part of Bury, Greater Manchester
 Fairfield, Clackmannanshire, a location in Scotland
 Fairfield, County Durham, a suburb
 Fairfield, Derbyshire, a village
 Fairfield, Evesham, a part of the town of Evesham, south-east Worcestershire
 Fairfield, Glasgow
 Fairfield, Kent, a village
 Fairfield, Liverpool, a part of Liverpool, Merseyside
 Fairfield, Stogursey, Somerset
 Fairfield, Tameside, a suburb of Droylsden, Greater Manchester
 Fairfield (Lake District), a mountain
 Fairfield Halls, an entertainment centre in Croydon
 Fairfield Moravian Church, in Droylsden, Manchester
 Fairfield Preparatory School, in Loughborough, Leicestershire
 Green Fairfield, a civil parish in Derbyshire
 Fairfields, a civil parish in Milton Keynes

United States
 Fairfield, Alabama, in Jefferson County
 Fairfield, Covington County, Alabama
 Fairfield, California
 Fairfield, Connecticut
 Fairfield County, Connecticut
 Fairfield, Idaho
 Fairfield, Illinois
 Fairfield, Iowa
 Fairfield, Kentucky
 Fairfield, Maine, a New England town
 Fairfield (CDP), Maine, the main village in the town
 Fairfield, Minnesota
 Fairfield, Montana
 Fairfield, Nebraska
 Fairfield Township, Cumberland County, New Jersey
 Fairfield Township, Essex County, New Jersey
 Fairfield, Monmouth County, New Jersey
 Fairfield, New York
 Fairfield, Hyde County, North Carolina
 Fairfield, North Dakota
 Fairfield, Ohio
 Fairfield County, Ohio
 Fairfield, Oklahoma
 Fairfield, Pennsylvania
 Fairfield, South Carolina, the death place of Abraham Nott
 Fairfield County, South Carolina
 Fairfield, Texas
 Fairfield, Utah
 Fairfield, Vermont
 Fairfield, Henrico County, Virginia, better known as Sandston
 Fairfield, Rockbridge County, Virginia, a census-designated place
 Fairfield (Berryville, Virginia), a historic house
 Fairfield, Washington
 Fairfield, Wisconsin, a town
 Fairfield (community), Wisconsin, an unincorporated community in the town

Companies
 Bethlehem Fairfield Shipyard, in Baltimore, Maryland
 Fairfield Enterprises, British supplier of finishing, converting and packaging machinery,
 Fairfield Geotechnologies, a geophysical company based in Houston
 Fairfield Greenwich Group, an investment firm
 Fairfield Sentry Fund, part of the Fairfield Greenwich Group
 Fairfield Shipbuilding and Engineering Company, a shipbuilder in Govan, Glasgow, Scotland
 Fairfield Manufacturing, now part of Dana Incorporated, a manufacturer of automotive and vehicle technology and machinery

Educational institutions
 Fairfield College Preparatory School, Fairfield, Connecticut, United States
 Fairfield College, Hamilton, New Zealand
 Fairfield Grammar School, Bristol, England
 Fairfield High School for Girls, Droylsden, Greater Manchester, England
 Fairfield Junior-Senior High School, Goshen, Indiana
 Fairfield Methodist Secondary School, Dover, Singapore
 Fairfield Methodist School (Primary), Dover, Singapore
 Fairfield School (Dunedin), Dunedin, New Zealand
 Fairfield University, Fairfield, Connecticut, United States
Fairfield Stags, the athletic programs representing Fairfield University

Transportation
 Fairfield station (Metro-North), Connecticut, United States
 Fairfield railway station (England)
 Fairfield railway station, Sydney, Australia
 Fairfield railway station, Melbourne, Australia
 Fairfield railway station, Brisbane, Australia
 Suisun–Fairfield station, Suisun City, California, United States
 Fairfield–Vacaville station, Fairfield, California, United States

Other uses
 Fairfield (surname)
 Fairfield Commons Mall, a mall in Beavercreek, Ohio
 Fairfield Plantation (Charleston County, South Carolina)
 Fairfield Plantation, Gloucester County, Virginia
 , a Royal Navy Hunt-class minesweeper launched in 1919
 Fairfield (typeface)

See also
 Fairfield High School (disambiguation)
 Fairfield House (disambiguation)
 Fairfield Township, Michigan (disambiguation)
 Fairfield Township, Minnesota (disambiguation)
 Fairfield Township, Nebraska (disambiguation)
 Fairfield Township, Pennsylvania (disambiguation)